Luke Nguyen (born 8 September 1978) is a Vietnamese–Australian chef and restaurateur, best known as the host of the television series, Luke Nguyen's Vietnam and Luke Nguyen's France. The former is a food documentary in which he travels through Vietnam, cooking in the ad hoc manner of the street vendors in the country, usually preparing the dish on the footpaths, and the latter is an exploration of the French influence on Vietnamese cuisine. He is a judge on the television series MasterChef Vietnam.

Following his first two series, the 10-episode Luke Nguyen's United Kingdom, first aired on 14 May 2015 with the London episode in which he toured the city's food markets with his brother, Lewis. In his most recent series, the 8 episode Luke Nguyen's Street Food Asia, first aired on 1 September 2016 he explores street food in Ho Chi Minh City, Bangkok, Kuala Lumpur and Jakarta.

He is the owner of Red Lantern restaurant in Surry Hills, Sydney and Vietnam House restaurant in Ho Chi Minh City and is the author of a number of cookbooks. He is also the man behind the restaurant Fat Noodle situated in the Star Casino Sydney and Treasury Casino in Brisbane. In 2009, Luke Nguyen and his then-partner, Suzanna Boyd founded the Little Lantern Foundation in Hoi An, which gives disadvantaged youths an opportunity to undertake a hospitality training program in Little Lantern's operating hotel – restaurant and bar.
 
Nguyen has appeared multiple times on the competitive cooking show MasterChef Australia as a guest chef, including season 2 episode 8, and season 8 episode 31.
 
Nguyen appeared on the season 7, episode 3 of the SBS genealogy series, Who Do You Think You Are? in which he learned of his previously unknown Hakka Chinese ancestry through his maternal grandfather, an immigrant from Guangdong. Though his mother had known about this for decades, for unspecified reasons she had hidden this information from Nguyen. The program also revealed information about the involvement of Nguyen's ancestors during the Indochina and Vietnam Wars.

References

External links 
Luke Nguyen's restaurant
Episode guide Luke Nguyen's Vietnam Series 1
Episode guide Luke Nguyen's Vietnam Series 2
Episode guide Luke Nguyen's France
Episode guide Luke Nguyen's United Kingdom
Episode guide Luke Nguyen's Street Food Asia

1978 births
Living people
Vietnamese television chefs
Vietnamese chefs
People from Hanoi
People from Sydney
Australian people of Vietnamese descent
Australian people of Chinese descent
Thai emigrants to Australia